Wheatland Township is a township in Ford County, Kansas, USA.  As of the 2000 census, its population was 170.

Geography
According to the USGS, it contains three cemeteries: Evergreen, Holy Cross and Saint Joseph.

The stream of Cow Creek runs through this township.

References
 USGS Geographic Names Information System (GNIS)

External links
 US-Counties.com
 City-Data.com

Townships in Ford County, Kansas
Townships in Kansas